The Journal of Geographical Systems is a quarterly peer-reviewed scientific journal published by Springer Science+Business Media. It covers geographical information, mathematical modeling, analysis, theory, regional science, geography, environmental sciences, planning, and decision. The editors-in-chief are Manfred M. Fischer (Vienna University of Economics and Business) and Antonio Páez (McMaster University).

Abstracting and indexing 
The journal is abstracted and indexed in:

According to the Journal Citation Reports, the journal has a 2012 impact factor of 1.366.

References

External links 
 

Springer Science+Business Media academic journals
Quarterly journals
Geography journals
English-language journals
Publications established in 1999